Spanish Mount Point is a historic archaeological site located at Edisto Beach State Park, Edisto Island, Colleton County, South Carolina.  Spanish Mount is an oyster-clam shell midden, about 27 meters long and 3 meters high. The site is bordered by water and marsh on three sides.  Spanish Mount dates between 2200 and 1800 BC and represents a transitional period of pre-history and the midden accumulated during the site's short term occupation.

It was listed in the National Register of Historic Places in 1974.

References

Archaeological sites on the National Register of Historic Places in South Carolina
Buildings and structures in Colleton County, South Carolina
National Register of Historic Places in Colleton County, South Carolina
Native American history of South Carolina